Vodopyanova is a surname. Notable people with the surname include:

Natalia Vodopyanova (born 1981), Russian basketball player
Tetyana Vodopyanova (born 1973), Ukrainian biathlete